The notion of orbit of a control system used in mathematical control theory is a particular case of the notion of orbit in group theory.

Definition
Let 
 
be a  control system, where 
 
belongs to a finite-dimensional manifold  and  belongs to a control set . Consider the family 

The orbit of the control system  through a point  is the subset  of  defined by

Remarks
The difference between orbits and attainable sets is that, whereas for attainable sets only forward-in-time motions are allowed, both forward and backward motions are permitted for orbits. 
In particular, if the family  is symmetric (i.e.,  if and only if ), then orbits and attainable sets coincide.

In this case one has to replace flows of vector fields by local versions of them.

Orbit theorem (Nagano–Sussmann)

The tangent space to the orbit
 at a point  is the linear subspace of  spanned by 

Otherwise, the inclusion  holds true.

Corollary (Rashevsky–Chow theorem)

If  for every  and if  is connected, then each orbit is equal to the whole manifold .

See also
Frobenius theorem (differential topology)

References

Further reading

Control theory